Deportivo Zacapa Tellioz is a Guatemalan football club from Zacapa, nicknamed "Los Gallos" (The Roosters). They play in the Primera División de Ascenso.

The team plays its home games at the Estadio David Ordoñez Bardales, the local stadium.

Current squad

External links

Zacapa
Association football clubs established in 1951
1951 establishments in Guatemala